Bon blanc may refer to:
Colombard, a white wine grape related to Chenin blanc and Gouais blanc
Gouais blanc, a white grape variety that is seldom grown today
Savagnin, a white wine grape mostly grown in the Jura region of France